Bethel Chapel may refer to:

United Kingdom

England
Bethel Chapel, Guildford, Surrey
Bethel Strict Baptist Chapel, Robertsbridge, East Sussex
Bethel Chapel, Shelf, West Yorkshire

Wales
Bethel Chapel, Abernant
Bethel Chapel, Gadlys
Bethel Baptist Chapel, Llanelli
Bethel Chapel, Miskin
Bethel Chapel, Ynysybwl

United States
Bethel Chapel AME Church, Louisiana, Missouri
Bethel Chapel Pentecostal Church, Granite City, Illinois

See also
Bethel Church (disambiguation)